The Chinese monal or Chinese impeyan (Lophophorus lhuysii) is a pheasant. This monal is restricted to mountains of central China. The plumage is highly iridescent. The male has a large drooping purple crest, a metallic green head, blue bare skin around the eyes, a reddish gold mantle, bluish green feathers and black underparts. The female is dark brown with white on its throat.

This is the largest of the three monals and, by mass, is one of the largest pheasants (after the turkeys and the green and Indian peafowls). Males measure  in length while females measure . The mean weight is reportedly .

The scientific name, lhuysii, commemorates the French statesman Édouard Drouyn de Lhuys.

Due to ongoing habitat loss and degradation, limited range and illegal hunting, the Chinese monal is evaluated as vulnerable on IUCN Red List of Threatened Species. It is listed on Appendix I of CITES.

In captivity
London Zoo and Beijing Zoo have kept Chinese monal but all attempts to establish a captive breeding population failed.

See also
List of endangered and protected species of China

References 

BirdLife Species Factsheet

External links 
 ARKive - images and video of the Chinese monal (Lophophorus lhuysii)

Chinese monal
Birds of China
Birds of Central China
Endemic birds of China
Chinese monal